Cebrail is a given name of Turkish origin, being a form of the name Gabriel. Notable people with the given name include:

Cebrail Karayel (born 1994), Turkish footballer
Cebrail Makreckis (born 2000), Latvian footballer

See also
Gabriel (given name)